Rebecca Cox Jackson (1795–1871) was a free Black woman, best known for her religious feminism and activism and for her autobiography, Gifts of Power: The Writings of Rebecca Cox Jackson, Black Visionary, Shaker Eldress, which was published in 1981 and edited by Jean McMahon Humez. Jackson worked as a seamstress and cared for her brother's children until she had a religious awakening in 1830. She divorced her husband when he failed to teach her how to read and write, but gained literacy as one of the spiritual gifts she believed were given to her by God; these gifts also included healing people, seeing the future, having visions, hearing God's voice, and acting as a medium. After leaving her husband, she joined the Shaker movement, which shared her values of egalitarianism and celibacy. Jackson began writing her autobiography in 1830 and completed it in 1864, describing her womanist theology and feminism, visions, and other religious experiences, as well as her accounts of her experiences of sexism, racism, and discrimination. She and her protégé and lifelong companion Rebecca Perot founded a Shaker community of Black women in Philadelphia in 1859. Jackson's relationship with Perot, which lasted for 35 years until Jackson's death in 1871, has been called "perhaps the most controversial element of Jackson’s autobiography".

Life
Rebecca Cox was born on February 15, 1795, in Hornstown, Pennsylvania into a free family. She never had children, but cared for her widowed brother's children while she lived with him. She married Samuel S. Jackson and worked as a seamstress until she had a religious awakening during a thunderstorm in 1830. Jackson had not written much about her life prior to this spiritual awakening, so not much is known. However, according to a work written by Alice Walker, Jackson's mother died when Rebecca was thirteen years old. At the time Jackson's autobiography begins, around age thirty-five, she lived with both her brother, Joseph Cox, who was an elder in Bethel A.M. E. Church, and her husband, maintaining housekeeping. She got divorced after her husband failed to teach her to read and write, and later realized she was able to do both anyway. She moved out of her brother's house and continued her spiritual journey in the Shaker religion.

While traveling from church to church, she came upon and decided to join the Shakers in Watervliet, New York. Jackson shared many of the same values that the Shakers did, but according to Walker, most important to Jackson was that "they believed in celibacy; the only religious group she ever heard of that did". She became a minister in that community, but left after experiencing racial discrimination. Jackson and her "protégé and lifelong companion" Rebecca Perot moved to Philadelphia where in 1859 Jackson established a Shaker group primarily ministering to Black women. She and Perot went back to Watervliet for a year, where Jackson finally made her pledge and received approval from the Shakers there, and then returned to Philadelphia where Jackson continued as Eldress of her family of Shakers until her death in 1871. She is buried in Eden Cemetery in Collingdale, Pennsylvania. Her autobiography, although it was written between 1830 and 1864, was published in 1981.

Womanist theology and feminism 
In 1830, Jackson experienced a spiritual awakening in the middle of a thunderstorm. Previous to this experience, she was terrified of thunderstorms. However, she had a revelation that God would protect her and communicate to her during thunderstorms and was afterwards devoted to her religion. She believed she had many gifts from God, including miraculously learning to read and write, healing people, seeing the future, having visions, hearing God's voice, and acting as a medium, among other gifts. She often also went through serious health issues that she said were related to her gifts from God. She later moved out of her brother's house as he used his superiority in the religion and his literacy to control Jackson. According to scholar Henry Louis Gates, Jr. in his book The Signifying Monkey: A Theory of African-American Literary Criticism, Alice Walker wrote him that Gifts of Power was the first book she read after finishing her novel The Color Purple and that Walker's dedication in The Color Purple ("To the Spirit") draws from her reaction to Jackson's autobiography. Gates states that the Spirit in Walker's dedication is the same Spirit that taught Jackson how to read and makes parallels between the literacy of Jackson and Celie, Walker's protagonist in The Color Purple.

Jackson divorced her husband and joined the Shakers in Watervliet, New York. However, they wanted her to make a pledge to a white Eldress named Mother Paulina Bates in order to be considered a "full member". Jackson did not feel comfortable allowing a white woman to gate-keep her religious journey, so she left. She later returned and agreed to take the pledge to Mother Paulina Bates and she was granted a blessing to minister to people herself. Motherhood was an important concept to Jackson, as it was an important aspect of being a woman that she wanted to embrace. While she never had children and wanted to remain celibate, she spoke of a spiritual maternity, or of being a mother figure for people in a spiritual way. Jackson was led by her religious beliefs in everything she did; as Walker stated, "Jackson felt compelled always to follow her own inner voice or 'invisible lead' ". She remained at this settlement until her death in 1871, where her "name and position were taken up by her life-long companion Rebecca Perot". The Black Shaker community in Philadelphia continued to exist as late as 1908.

Jackson's feminism was very much rooted in her religiosity. According to Gloria T. Hull, who reviewed Jackson's autobiography after it was discovered in 1981, "Jackson's [spiritual] gifts helped her identity, dignity, self-confidence, courage, and real skills to balance the skewed power dynamics a woman like her survives against in [America]". The fact that she joined the Shakers alone shows her feminism, as "the Shakers believe in a dual, Mother-Father godhead". Jackson saw great importance of the potential of women to bear children. She and other religious figures used the fact that her community acknowledged the importance of pregnancy and creating life as a strategy to combat the prominence of male symbolism in religion and spirituality, as well as in leadership roles. Jackson's spirituality was definitely crucial to her accepting her position as a woman and seeing the power in that "Jackson's matricentric theology has enabled her to accept first the feminine and finally the maternal in herself. Her narrative explores both daughterly and maternal subject positions, but her quest for agency separates both from biological limitations". Her feminism manifested itself in her spirituality, which allowed her to believe she had power coming from her marginalized position. According to Kimberly R. Connerly in her discussion of Alice Walker's review of Jackson's autobiography, “Jackson’s choice to embrace a 'marginal identity' casts her as an actual example of one who lived a womanist lifestyle in Walker’s terms and her own brand of spirituality and Christian doctrine closely resembles beliefs Walker advocates for a womanist theology...but the blending of the influences of race and gender that characterize a contemporary womanist perspective as defined by Walker are Jackson’s own unique innovation”. Around this time she met her lifelong companion Rebecca Perot. Both women continued to have visions, even appearing in each other's visions; Perot said in one of her visions that Jackson was "crowned King and me crowned Queen of Africa", while Jackson saw the two of them "unit[ing] in the covenant". The two women were together for thirty-five years, until Jackson's death. She was able to reframe a power dynamic where she initially did not benefit, into a situation where she created her own path and future; because she felt God was paving a way for her, nothing was impossible for her.

Personal life 
Shortly after the end of Jackson's marriage to Samuel S. Jackson and her separation from her brother Joseph Cox, she met her lifelong companion Rebecca Perot. It is not clear whether their relationship was romantic  or not, since Jackson followed the Shaker practice of celibacy, but as Laurel Bollinger in her article on maternity and authority explained, "Jackson’s relationship with Perot has been perhaps the most controversial element of Jackson’s autobiography". Alice Walker stated that "These two women lived together, ate together, travelled together, prayed together and slept together until the end of Jackson’s life some thirty-odd years after they met”. However, we do not know if there was a sexual or romantic aspect to this relationship.

Works
Gifts of Power: The Writings of Rebecca Jackson, Black Visionary, Shaker Eldress edited with an introduction by Jean McMahom Humez. Amherst, MA: University of Massachusetts Press, 1981.

References

Works cited 

 Bollinger, Laurel (1 January 2000). "'A Mother in the Deity': Maternity and Authority in the Nineteenth-Century African-American Spiritual Narrative." Women's Studies, vol. 29, no. 3, pp. 357–382.  
Hull, Gloria T. (Autumn 1982). "Review: Rebecca Cox Jackson and the Uses of Power." Tulsa Studies in Women's Literature, vol. 1, no. 2,  pp. 203–209.
 Gates, Jr., Henry Louis (1989). The Signifying Monkey: A Theory of African-American Literary Criticism. New York: Oxford University Press. ISBN 019506075X.
 Walker, Alice (September/October 1981). "Review of Gifts of Power: The Writings of Rebecca Cox Jackson (1795-1871), Black Visionary, Shaker Eldress, by J. M. Humez." The Black Scholar, vol. 12, no. 5, pp. 64–67.

1795 births
1871 deaths
African-American women writers
American autobiographers
19th-century American women writers
African-American Methodists
Clergy from Philadelphia
American Shaker missionaries
Female Christian missionaries
Underground Railroad people
People from Colonie, New York
19th-century Methodists
19th-century American clergy
Women autobiographers
19th-century American non-fiction writers
American women non-fiction writers